Vulcan is a commune in Brașov County, Transylvania, Romania, 16 km west of the county capital Brașov. It is composed of two villages, Colonia 1 Mai (Konkordiabányatelep) and Vulcan. It also included Holbav village until 2004, when it was split off to form a separate commune.

Since its founding around the year 1377 it was one of the most important villages in the Burzenland area, where there was a strong Transylvanian Saxon community.

References

External links
  County council's page about Vulcan
  Vulcan page at www.burzenland.de

Communes in Brașov County
Localities in Transylvania
Burzenland